Lauron may refer to:

 Battle of Lauron, a battle in 76 BC involving ancient Rome
 LAURON, six-legged walking robot from Germany
 Lauron (moth), a genus of moths